Nthako Sam Matiase is a member of the National Assembly of South Africa. He is a member of the Economic Freedom Fighters.

Political career
A member of the Economic Freedom Fighters party, Matiase entered the National Assembly on 21 May 2014 as a replacement for Khumbuza Bavu.

During his first term, he was a member of numerous committees, including the  Portfolio Committee on Health, the Portfolio Committee on Justice and Correctional Services and the  Portfolio Committee on Rural Development and Land Reform. He was also an alternate member of the  Portfolio Committee on Health, the  Standing Committee on Finance and the  Portfolio Committee on Justice and Correctional Services.

Matiase was re-elected in the 2019 general election. He is currently a member of both the  Portfolio Committee on Agriculture, Land Reform and Rural Development and the Joint Standing Committee on Defence.

References

Living people
Year of birth missing (living people)
Economic Freedom Fighters politicians
Members of the National Assembly of South Africa
21st-century South African politicians